Lafayette High School was a large secondary school located in the Bath Beach section of Brooklyn, New York City, New York. It closed in 2010.

History
Named after Gilbert du Motier, Marquis de Lafayette, Lafayette High School is situated in what was formerly the town of Gravesend. All the towns in Kings County were settled by the Dutch with the exception of Gravesend, which was first settled by a colony of English people under the leadership of Lady Deborah Moody, a woman of considerable wealth and education, who took a prominent part in public affairs, and whose home was on Neck Road. According to the New York City Ward Map of Kings County in 1899, the school is located on the former property of John Carter. This map reveals a frame house with stables on the site of the building.

Lafayette High School, the first building of its type, was designed to accommodate about 4,000 pupils. The cost of the site was $211,350 while the building itself necessitated an outlay of $2,820,000. There are two other high schools in the city, which are duplicates of this type – Christopher Columbus and William Cullen Bryant. Dr. Frederick William Oswald was asked to assume the principalship of the new school. As the new building was not ready, the school had to meet in three annexes. These annexes were P.S. 180, with Mr. Joseph Grady in charge, assisted by Mr. Freilich and Mr. Abraham Margolies; P.S. 126, under the direction of Miss Dorothy K. Lewis and Mr. Robert Buda; and P.S. 192 with Mr. Walter Jacobsen in charge. In March 1939, the faculty had been increased to 156 members and the student population numbered some 4,500 boys and girls. On November 13, 1939, the formal exercises dedicating Lafayette High School took place in the auditorium. Among those present was Mayor Fiorello H. LaGuardia.

As measured by graduation rates, Lafayette's performance was low: 44.4 percent of the class of 2006 graduated on time. and a 63.2 percent 7-year graduation rate.

According to the New York City Department of Education, Lafayette's students speak at least 30 different languages. With the explosion of the Asian population, the school has been accused of harassment and unequal treatment based on race and ethnicity. After much complaints, Lafayette was the subject of a June 2004 consent decree between the New York City Department of Education and the United States Department of Justice which found evidence of "severe and pervasive peer-on-peer harassment of Asian students."Under the consent decree, Lafayette students needing help in English would be assigned appropriate classes within 10 days of enrolling (e.g., Mandarin-speaking students would not be placed in bilingual classes taught in Cantonese). Lafayette also pledged to develop a policy clarifying school officials' obligations to report cases of harassment based on race, color, and national origin, and to heighten diversity awareness among staff and students. The Justice Department was to monitor Lafayette's progress over the next three years.

Lafayette has experienced criminal activity involving their students. Extra police officers and security guards were added when the New York City Department of Education labeled it an "Impact School". After some improvement, in April 2006, Lafayette was removed from the Impact list. In December 2006, New York City's plans to close Lafayette High School were announced, along with four other low-performing schools that failed to improve under city guidance. Applying a strategy of the Bloomberg administration, the large closed schools would each be replaced by several small schools with about 400 or 500 students each.

Principal Jolanta Rohloff stepped down on March 30, 2007 and was replaced by Doris Unger, to oversee the closing of the school, having previously overseen the closing of Seward Park High School. Principal Rohloff was praised by Department of Education officials for her work attempting to turn around the school, but criticized by the community, teachers, and students for heavy-handiness She was assigned by the Department of Education to mentor principals and teachers on how to interpret student performance data and make necessary adjustments to instruction. On September 15, 2008, a press release stated that Ms. Doris Unger had been promoted to superintendent. On September 19, 2008, it was announced to the staff at Lafayette HS that the assistant principal, Jacqueline Boswell would be the new principal.

Notable alumni
Of all high schools in New York State, Lafayette has the most alumni, 13, who reached the Major League Baseball.
Bob Aspromonte, baseball player brother of Ken
Ken Aspromonte, baseball player brother of Bob
Angelo Badalamenti, composer
Kevin Baez, baseball player
Tony Balsamo, baseball player
Sal Campisi, baseball player
Herb Cohen, author, negotiator
Alex Coletti, producer
Vic Damone, singer
Benny Distefano, baseball player
Jeffrey Epstein, financier
Jerry Della Femina, author, restaurateur, advertising agent
Pete Falcone, baseball player
Al Ferrara, baseball player
Mike Fiore, baseball player
John Franco, baseball player
Mike Garson, musician
Gary David Goldberg, producer and sitcom creator
Eugène Green, novelist, playwright, film maker
Wally Green, table tennis player
Fred Hellerman, singer, songwriter
Robert Kerman, actor
Jeffrey Kessler, sports and antirust lawyer 
Larry King, journalist and talk show host
Sandy Koufax, baseball player
Richard LaGravenese, screenwriter
Michael Lerner, actor
Dave Liebman, musician
Luis Lopez, baseball player
Norm Mager basketball player
Peter Max, artist
Larry Merchant, sportswriter
Theodore Millon, psychologist, author
Vickie Natale, singer, songwriter, and CBS Star Search champion
Eric Ober, President of CBS News
Rochelle Owens, poet and playwright
Rhea Perlman, actress 
Archie Rand, artist
Steve Schirripa, actor and author
Maurice Sendak, artist
Paul Sorvino, actor
Elliott Stein, film critic and historian
Michael Steinhardt, financier
Frank P. Tomasulo, film professor and journal editor
Fred Wilpon, New York Mets owner
Larry Yellen, baseball player
Walter Zanger, journalist and author

References

External links
Feud Over Lafayette High School
Thugs rule school at Lafayette High

Public high schools in Brooklyn
Educational institutions established in 1939
Educational institutions disestablished in 2010
1939 establishments in New York (state)
2010 disestablishments in New York (state)